This is a survey of the postage stamps and postal history of Nova Scotia.

First stamps
The first stamps of Nova Scotia were issued in 1851.

1863 issue in cents 

Values 1 to  cents.

Nova Scotia joined the Dominion of Canada in 1867.

See also
 List of people on stamps of the Canadian provinces
 Postage stamps and postal history of Canada

References

Further reading
 Argenti, Nicholas. The Postage Stamps of New Brunswick and Nova Scotia. London: Royal Philatelic Society London, 1962  223p. The book was reprinted by Quarterman Publications in 1976.
 Cameron, Chris F. Maccan Post Office: 140 Years of Postal Service, 1872-2012. Edmonton: Chris F. Cameron, 2012  57p.
 MacDonald, J.J. The Nova Scotia Post: Its Offices, Masters and Marks, 1700-1867. Toronto: Unitrade Press, 1985  295p.
 MacDonald, Ken. Post Offices and Postal Routes of Halifax County. Saskatoon: Saskatoon Stamp Centre, 1999  390p.
 MacDonald, Ken. Post Offices and Postal Routes of Pictou County. Saskatoon: Saskatoon Stamp Centre, 1999  316p.
 Macpherson, L. B. Nova Scotian Postal History: Post offices (1754-1981). Halifax, N.S.: Petheric Press, 1982  136p.
 Mitchell, R. B. Nova Scotia Fakes & Forgeries. Halifax, N.S.: Scotia Stamp Studio, 1976 49p.
 Munden, Carl. Post offices of Cape Breton. Dartmouth, N.S.: C. Munden, 1986 four volumes.
 Poole, Bertram W. H. The Postage Stamps of New Brunswick and Nova Scotia. Beverly, MA.: Severn-Wylie-Jewett, 1920? 20p.
 Small, Richard E. The Post Offices of Nova Scotia 1755-1986. Reston, VA.: R.E. Small, 2001 117p.

External links
 Nova Scotia Stamp Club.

Philately of Canada
Economy of Nova Scotia